Baccaro may refer to:

Baccaro, Nova Scotia, a community in Nova Scotia, Canada

People with the surname
Leandro Baccaro (born 1973), Argentine field hockey player
Salvatore Baccaro (1944–1984), Italian actor

See also
East Baccaro, Nova Scotia, a community in Nova Scotia, Canada
West Baccaro, Nova Scotia, a community in Nova Scotia, Canada